Shamier Anderson (born May 6, 1991) is a Canadian actor. He is known for playing U.S. Deputy Marshal Xavier Dolls on the television series Wynonna Earp and his role as Trevante Cole on Invasion.

Background 
Anderson is the older brother of actor Stephan James. He graduated from Wexford Collegiate School for the Arts as an Ontario Scholar then went on to study criminology and trained with weapons prior to breaking into acting. He has training in martial arts Wing Chun Kung Fu. Anderson's parents are from Spanish Town, Jamaica.

He started his film career in 2010.

He currently resides in Los Angeles.

Nonprofit work

Anderson and his brother, fellow actor Stephan James, founded a non-profit called B.L.A.C.K. Canada (Building a Legacy in Acting, Cinema + Knowledge) in 2016. In December 2020, they announced an extension of the organization called The Black Academy, which showcases Black talent across Canada in the arts, culture, entertainment, and sports. Anderson explained, "The impetus of The Black Academy stems from our long-lasting commitment, deep ties to our community, and an awareness of the lack of opportunities to celebrate and elevate Black talent in Canada." The organization's vision includes building a coalition of supporters who can provide funding, mentorship, programming, and awards to support Black excellence in Canada. More recently, he and Stephan James has struck a deal with Boat Rocker.

Filmography

Film

Television

References

External links

 
 

Living people
Canadian male film actors
Canadian male television actors
Black Canadian male actors
Canadian male child actors
Male actors from Toronto
21st-century Canadian male actors
1991 births
Canadian people of Jamaican descent